Aaron Sabaoni was an Italian editor of Moses Albaz's cabalistic ritual, "Hekal ha-Ḳodesh," to which he added notes, and which was printed in Amsterdam, 1653. It is conjectured that he was named after the city of Sabbionetta; but in the seventeenth century he resided in Sale, and, with Jacob Sasportas, participated in the condemnation of the followers of Shabbethai Ẓebi for refusing to keep the four chief fast-days, on the ground that the Messiah had already arrived.

References

Year of birth unknown
1841 deaths
19th-century Italian Jews
Jewish writers
Kabbalists
People from Sabbioneta